Gali Muddu Krishnama Naidu (26 May 1947 – 7 February 2018)  was an Indian politician from Andhra Pradesh. He served as Minister of Higher Education, Andhra Pradesh. He was elected for a record six terms to the Andhra Pradesh Legislative Assembly, five times from the former Puttur constituency and once from the Nagari constituency.

Early life
Gali Muddu Krishnama Naidu was born on 26 May 1947, in Venkatramapuram village of Ramachandrapuram mandal in the Chittoor District of Andhra Pradesh. His father was G. Rama Naidu and his mother was G. Rajamma. He was the youngest of three children; he had an older sister Duttuluri Jayalakshmi and an older brother Gali Dhanunjaya Naidu.

Naidu graduated with a BSc and obtained a master's degree in arts as well as a law degree. Before he joined politics, he taught as a college lecturer in Guntur.

Political career
Naidu joined politics after a successful career in teaching. He joined the Telugu Desam Party (TDP) where he enjoyed the support of its founder member, N.T. Rama Rao, who founded the party in 1983. He was elected five times to the Andhra Pradesh Legislative Assembly for the TDP from the Puttur constituency.

After some differences with the TDP, he left to join the Indian National Congress party, where he contested a ticket and won the election in 2004. He subsequently resigned from the congress and rejoined the TDP in 2008; he was then re-elected to his sixth (and final) term to the Andhra Pradesh Legislative Assembly in 2009, this time for the Nagari constituency. By now the Puttur constituency had been dissolved into the Nagari constituency following the delimitation of constituencies in 2008.

He held a cabinet post in the Ministry for Education, as Minister of Higher Education. When serving as a minister, he held education and forest portfolios.

Naidu officiated over many development works in the city of Puttur, including the construction of a road-over-bridge at the Santhi theatre level crossing, and the Puttur to Chittoor highway.

Personal life
Naidu was married to Smt G. Saraswathi from Velanjeri village in Tamil Nadu. He had two sons, named Bhanu Prakash Gali and Jagadish Prakash Gali, and a daughter named Lavanya Gali.

As well as being a teacher, he was an agriculturist and enjoyed reading books.

He underwent heart surgery three months before his death.

Death
Naidu was admitted to a private hospital in Hyderabad on 3 February 2018 to receive treatment for dengue fever. He died four days later from multiple organ failure.

Notes
 At the time of Naidu's birth, Chittoor was in the Madras Presidency (this became the Madras Province shortly thereafter and later the Madras State), and is now in the state of Andhra Pradesh which was newly formed nine years after Naidu was born.

References

1947 births
2018 deaths
Andhra Pradesh MLAs 1983–1985
Andhra Pradesh MLAs 1985–1989
Andhra Pradesh MLAs 1989–1994
Andhra Pradesh MLAs 1994–1999
Andhra Pradesh MLAs 2004–2009
Andhra Pradesh MLAs 2009–2014
People from Chittoor district
Telugu Desam Party politicians